Ömer Kaner (born 21 May 1951) is a Turkish football coach and former player. He played at Eskişehirspor, Fenerbahçe and Karagümrük as a striker.
He is currently been head coach of Turkey national futsal team. He played, coached and managed of Fenerbahçe SK.

Managing career
 Fenerbahçe SK - 1990
 Denizlispor 1993-1994
 Pogoń Szczecin - 2000-2001
 Altay SK 2001-2002
 Turkey national futsal team - 2006-

External links
  (as player}
  (as coach)
 

1951 births
Living people
Turkish footballers
Eskişehirspor footballers
Fenerbahçe S.K. footballers
Zonguldakspor footballers
Association football forwards
Turkish football managers
Fenerbahçe football managers
Turkish expatriate football managers
Expatriate football managers in Poland
Turkey international footballers